Unlocked is a short film, directed by Daryl Wein, with a screenplay by Peter Duchan and Daryl Wein, executive produced by Stephen Daldry, and starring Olivia Thirlby and Daniel Sauli. It was an official selection of the 2006 Gijon International Film Festival and the 2007 Tribeca Film Festival.

References

External links

2006 short films
2006 films